Endrendrum is a 2014 Tamil film written, produced, and directed by Ssinish Sreedharan. It started off as a short film, and over the period of time, it was developed in to a tele-feature film.  The film stars Sathish Krishnan and Priyanka Reddy in the lead roles, and Sai Dheena, Theepetti Ganesan, Meera Krishnan, Misha Ghoshal, Bala Saravanan, and Yogi Babu in other roles. The music was composed by Dharan Kumar, and film was edited by Tirupattur Sathyanarayan Suresh. The film was released on 7 March 2014. This film plot is loosely based on Just Like Heaven .

Cast

 Sathish Krishnan as Charles
 Priyanka Reddy as Diana
 Sai Dheena
 Theepetti Ganesan
 Meera Krishnan
 Misha Ghoshal
 Bala Saravanan
 Yogi Babu
 Som shekar
 Rinson Simon
 Vijay Varma

Soundtrack
Music for Endrendrum has been composed by Dharan Kumar. Audio was launched at 15 July 2013 at Sathyam Cinemas. Director-producer Gautham Vasudev Menon and Studio Green's K. E. Gnanavel Raja. attended the event. Behindwoods wrote:": Nothing new to offer, but Endrendrum is a pleasant listening experience".

 "Endrendrum" - Nikhil Mathew
 "Kanne Kanne" - Ranina Reddy
 "Kanneere" - Dharan Kumar
 "Thoda Thoda" - Haricharan, Ranina Reddy

References

External links
 

Indian thriller films
2014 films
2010s Tamil-language films
Films scored by Dharan Kumar
2014 thriller films